A look-alike, double, or doppelgänger is a person who bears a strong physical resemblance to another person, excluding cases like twins and other instances of family resemblance.

Some look-alikes have been notable individuals in their own right, such as Britain's King George V and Russia's Tsar Nicholas II, who bore a striking resemblance to each other (they were first cousins). Other notable look-alikes have been notable solely for resembling well-known individuals, such as Clifton James, who acted as a double for British Field Marshal Bernard Montgomery during World War II.

Some look-alikes who have resembled celebrities have worked as entertainers, impersonating them on stage and screen, or at venues like parties and corporate functions. Professional look-alikes have often been represented by talent agencies specializing in celebrity impersonators.
 
Close physical resemblance between two or more individuals is also a common plot point in works of fiction.

Notable look-alikes 
 Cousins, Britain's King George V (1865–1936) and Russia's Tsar Nicholas II (1868–1918), shared an uncanny resemblance. Their facial features were only different up close (especially the eyes). At George's wedding in 1893, according to The Times of London, the crowd may have confused Nicholas with George, because their beards and dress made them look alike.
 An urban legend claims that Charlie Chaplin entered one of the many Chaplin look-alike contests and lost. It is retold in the musical Chaplin.
 Mikheil Gelovani, a Georgian actor and Joseph Stalin look-alike, played the Soviet leader in propaganda films of the 1930s and 1940s.

 In 1944, shortly before D-Day, M. E. Clifton James, who bore a close resemblance to Field Marshal Bernard Montgomery, was sent to Gibraltar and North Africa, in order to deceive the Germans about the location of the upcoming invasion. This story was the subject of a book and film, I Was Monty's Double.
 A notable conspiracy theory holds that Paul McCartney died in 1966 and was replaced by a Canadian policeman named William Shears Campbell.
 In the 1970s, actor-comedian Richard M. Dixon (born James LaRoe), look-alike to then-President Richard Nixon, gained some celebrity, portraying the president in the films, Richard (1972) and The Faking of the President (1976). He also appeared in director Woody Allen's initially unreleased short film Men of Crisis: The Harvey Wallinger Story (1971).
 Jeannette Charles has, since the early 1970s, worked as a look-alike to Britain's Queen Elizabeth II.
 British stuntman Vic Armstrong acted as  Harrison Ford's body double in all the films of the original Indiana Jones trilogy. Reportedly, Armstrong looked so much like Harrison Ford that the crewmembers on set were constantly mistaking him for Ford.
 When Uffe Ellemann-Jensen was Denmark's foreign minister, he was often compared to Danish pop singer Johnny Reimar.
 Saddam Hussein allegedly employed several look-alikes for political purposes during his Iraq reign. According to a CBS 60 Minutes segment in late January 2008, Saddam Hussein denied to an American interrogator that he had employed doubles.
 The BBC comedy programme Doubletake made extensive use of look-alikes playing their doubles in apparently embarrassing situations, seen through CCTV cameras and amateur video, using distance shots and shaky camera-work to disguise the true identity of those being filmed. Due to the nature of this programme and conditions of filming, many of the world's most authentic lookalikes boycotted the project leaving the producer to rely on the careful use of soft focus, lighting and carefully positioned camera angles to make the mainly amateur lookalikes resemble the characters they portrayed.
 Armando Iannucci's Friday Night Armistice (1996–98) featured "the bus of Dianas", a bus full of Princess Diana look-alikes which was dispatched to "care" at the sites of various minor tragedies.
 Steve Sires, a look-alike of Microsoft's Bill Gates, came to attention when he attempted to trademark "Microsortof", and subsequently acted in Microsoft commercials. He appeared as Gates in the films Nothing So Strange (2002) and The Social Network (2010).
 UK Celebrity Big Brother contestant Chantelle Houghton worked briefly and unsuccessfully for a look-alike agency as a Paris Hilton look-alike, earning the nickname "Paris Travelodge". By the time Chantelle Houghton won series 4 of Celebrity Big Brother, the same agency had already signed up a professional model who made a more convincing Paris Hilton look-alike... and who was briefly also offered as a fake "Chantelle".
 UK Richard and Judy ran a competition for Little Britain Lookalikes in 2005. After the live final broadcast on Friday, 28 January 2005, on Channel Four, two winning contestants, Gavin Pomfret and Stuart Morrison, formed a Little Britain tribute act called "Littler Britain."
 Dolly Parton has stated that she lost a 'Dolly Parton Look-Alike Contest'.
 In 2008 a friend pointed out to Bronx native Louis Ortiz his striking resemblance to then-presidential-candidate Barack Obama. Ortiz, initially as a money-making venture, sought gigs as an Obama impersonator. Ryan Murdock produced a documentary film about Ortiz's experiences, Bronx Obama.
 Two of the Parti Québécois's candidates: Bertrand St-Arnaud and Bernard Drainville
 Larissa Tudor looked strikingly similar to former Grand Duchess Tatiana of Russia. Larissa's background was sketchy and included a lot of irregularities. After her death in 1926 it was rumored that she was the former grand duchess. When author Occleshaw wrote a book about Larissa 60 years after her death, those who had known her identified a picture of the former Grand Duchess Tatiana as being Larissa.
 Howard X is a professional impersonator who looks like the North Korean leader Kim Jong-Un.
 Former basketball player Andrew Bynum has famously been compared to actor Tracy Morgan
 Suzie Kennedy is a British impersonator who looks like the actress Marilyn Monroe, and in 2020 impersonated her on America's Got Talent.
 Two baseball players, both called Brady Feigl, share an uncanny resemblance to each other. Additionally, both are pitchers for their respective baseball teams, they are the same height, and they both suffered an elbow injury that was treated by the same doctor.

Fictional look-alikes

Literature 
 In Edgar Allan Poe's short story "William Wilson" (1839), a man is followed by his double.
 In Fyodor Dostoyevsky's novella The Double (1846), an insecure, gauche government clerk in St. Petersburg, Russia, Yakov Pyotrovich Golyadkin, psychotically encounters a double of himself who looks identical to him but has all the charm, unctuousness, and social skills that he himself lacks.
 Alexandre Dumas, père's, The Man in the Iron Mask (1850—the third part of Dumas' novel, The Vicomte de Bragelonne) involves King Louis XIV of France and the King's identical twin.
 In Charles Dickens' novel A Tale of Two Cities (1859), two characters, Charles Darnay and Sydney Carton, bear an uncanny resemblance to one another.
 In The Woman in White (1859), by Wilkie Collins, the protagonist meets two women, Anne Catherick and Laura Fairlie, who strongly resemble one another. (See also Wilkie Collins' The Woman in White in "Illegitimacy in fiction: Victorian".)
 In Mark Twain's first historical fiction (1882), the novel The Prince and the Pauper, Prince Edward, son of Henry VIII of England, and his pauper look-alike, Tom Canty, trade places.
 In Anthony Hope's novel The Prisoner of Zenda (1894), a man impersonates a king he closely resembles, after the king is abducted on the eve of his coronation.
 Bolesław Prus' historical novel Pharaoh (1895) features several cases of look-alikes. The characters include the Haranian Phut (aka the Chaldean priest Berossus) and his look-alike (chapter 20), and the protagonist Ramses and his look-alike and nemesis, Lykon. Also, chapter 33 makes reference to look-alikes of an earlier pharaoh, Ramses the Great.
 Georg Kaiser's 1917 play The Coral depicts a powerful industrialist whose male secretary is his exact double. The secretary's duties include impersonating his employer at public functions. Other employees can tell the two men apart only by the fact that the secretary always wears a coral watch-fob.
 The Living and the Dead, 1954 novel by collaborators Boileau-Narcejac, on which Alfred Hitchcock based his 1958 film Vertigo.
 In Robert Heinlein's novel Double Star (1956), actor Lawrence Smith is approached to impersonate prominent politician John Joseph Bonforte, who has been kidnapped, despite his antipathy toward Bonforte's policies. In studying the man to perfect his imposture, Smith eventually comes to admire Bonforte. He continues this performance through an election and, when Bonforte dies, the subsequent tenure in office as "Supreme Minister." This story parallels that of the film Dave, but in this case when the actual politician dies, and Bonforte's staff begins to suggest shifts in policy contrary to Bonforte's beliefs, Smith refuses to submit to their desires, removes them from their positions, and continues in the role for the rest of his life, in honor of Bonforte's legacy.
 In Daphne du Maurier's novel The Scapegoat (1957), an Englishman meets his double, a French aristocrat, while visiting France, and is forced into changing places with him, finding himself caught up in all the intrigues and passions of his double's complex family.
 In Richard Powell's novel Don Quixote, U.S.A. (1966), Arthur Peabody Goodpasture, an inept Peace Corps volunteer and the spitting image of El Gavilan, a revolutionary leader in the fictional Republic of San Marco in South America, is forced to assume the identity of El Gavilan after the original is kidnapped and taken to the Soviet Union when El Gavilan's plot to have Goodpasture abducted by the Russians goes wrong.
 In Jack Higgins's 1975 novel The Eagle Has Landed, Nazi German paratroopers attempt to abduct British Prime Minister Winston Churchill from an English village he is visiting. It subsequently transpires that the actual Churchill had been elsewhere while a political decoy visited the village.
 "The Leader and the Damned" (1983) by Colin Forbes is a secret history thriller whose plot is based on the assumption that Adolf Hitler was assassinated in 1943, a bomb completely destroying his body. The Nazi hierarchy kept this as a top secret and got a double to impersonate Hitler, and it was this double who led Nazi Germany until its final demise in 1945.
 In Clive Cussler's 1984 novel Deep Six, a double is used after the U.S. president is kidnapped by Korean and Soviet agents.
 In David Lodge's 1984 novel Small World, the protagonist keeps running into two women, Angelica and Lily, who are identical twin sisters with confusingly different personalities.
 Christopher Priest's novel The Prestige (1995) features two rival magicians, one of whom uses his twin brother as a double in a disappearing-and-reappearing act.
 In Neil Gaiman's novel Coraline (2002) the heroine meets up with improved look-alikes of her parents and all her neighbors when she enters the Other Mother's world.
 José Saramago's 2002 novel The Double traces the intertwining lives of a history teacher and his bit-actor identical double, one of whom ends up dead while the other ends up living with the other's widow.
 In Christopher Golden's novel Dead Ringers (2015) the main characters find themselves invaded by people exactly like them, but "better" or with malicious intent.
 In Britain's Private Eye magazine, a long-running satirical feature of the letters section intentionally reversed the captions on look-alike photographs.
 In A.M. Kherbash's novel Lesath (2019) the protagonist is mistaken for an escaped inmate and is incarcerated in a remote facility.

Film 
 The Woman in White (1912), adapted from the Wilkie Collins novel The Woman in White, was followed by 1917, 1929, and 1948 film versions.
 In the 1918 lost film To Hell with the Kaiser!, Lawrence Grant plays both Kaiser Wilhelm  and his double Robert Graubel.
 Charles Dickens' novel A Tale of Two Cities (see "Literature", above) has been produced as three film versions between 1911 and 1958, as well as television and stage adaptations.
 Anthony Hope's novel The Prisoner of Zenda (see "Literature", above) has been the basis for many film and stage adaptations, the first film version being in 1913; the best-known film version is John Cromwell's 1937 film.
 Mark Twain's novel The Prince and the Pauper (see "Literature", above) has been the basis for many film and stage adaptations, the earliest film version being in 1920.
 Alexandre Dumas, père's, The Man in the Iron Mask (see "Literature", above) has been adapted into eight film versions between 1929 and 1998.
 The Student of Prague (1926): Balduin is followed by his double after making a deal with the devil.
 The 1932 musical film The Phantom President depicts a man who is eminently qualified to be President of the United States but who is unlikely to be elected because he is dull and lacks charisma. Fortunately, he has an exact double: a patent-medicine salesman and vaudeville hoofer who is a charismatic campaigner but has no actual political qualifications. The film cynically suggests that most American voters would prefer the latter to the former. Both roles are played by legendary song-and-dance man George M. Cohan.
 The 1940 comedy film The Great Dictator was Charlie Chaplin's first talkie and his most commercially successful film. Chaplin plays both "Adenoid Hynkel" (a satirized Adolf Hitler) and a Jewish barber who is Hynkel's spitting image. The barber eventually replaces Hynkel, who has been arrested after having been mistaken for the barber. On nationwide radio the barber, impersonating the dictator, declares in a great rousing speech an end to anti-semitism and a return to democracy.
 In The Strange Death of Adolf Hitler (1943), directed by James P. Hogan and starring Ludwig Donath, a man plans to murder Adolf Hitler and steal his identity.
 Angel on My Shoulder (1946): The Devil persuades a deceased gangster, played by Paul Muni, to let his soul possess the body of an honest judge who looks exactly like the gangster and who is causing the Devil distress with his honesty.
 The Magic Face (1951): Adolf Hitler is killed by his valet and double, Rudi Janus, who takes his place.
 Vertigo (1958), a classic American film noir psychological thriller directed and produced by Alfred Hitchcock. The story was based on the 1954 novel D'entre les morts (From Among the Dead) by Boileau-Narcejac.
 The Square Peg (1959): Norman Wisdom plays road repairer Norman Pitkin, who is called up for the army and sent to Nazi-occupied France, and also Pitkin's exact double, General Schreiber.
 The Scapegoat (1959): Alec Guinness plays both a French aristocrat and the English schoolteacher who is maneuvered into taking his place so the Frenchman can have an alibi for a murder.
 In the James Bond film Thunderball (1965), French NATO pilot François Derval is murdered by Angelo, a SPECTRE henchman who has been surgically altered to match Derval's appearance. Angelo then takes Derval's place aboard, and seizes, a NATO plane loaded with two atom bombs.
 Pharaoh (1966), directed by Jerzy Kawalerowicz, is adapted from Bolesław Prus' historical novel Pharaoh (see "Literature", above).
 In The Double Man (1967) an American CIA agent (Yul Brynner) is lured to Austria, so that an East German lookalike can take his place.
 In the Metro-Goldwyn-Mayer film Where Eagles Dare (1968), set in the winter of 1943–44, a U.S. Army Brigadier General George Carnaby (Robert Beatty), who is a chief planner for the Western Front, is captured by the Germans. He is taken for interrogation to a mountaintop fortress and needs to be rescued by a team of Allied commandos before the Germans realize that he is in fact an impostor, a lookalike U.S. corporal named Cartwright Jones.
 In Gentlemen of Fortune (1971), a Soviet crime comedy movie, Yevgeny Leonov plays both the protagonist, a good-hearted kindergarten principal Yevgeny Troshkin, and his exact double, a vile crime boss nicknamed "Docent". Since Docent stole a precious artifact and refused to give it out, the police hire Troshkin to impersonate him, so he could get any useful information from Docent's henchmen. Eventually, this results in Troshkin slowly re-educating the gang.
 Love and Death: 1975 Woody Allen satire on 19th-century Russian novels, set during the 1812 French invasion of Russia. A coward, Boris Grushenko (Allen), and his wife Sonja (Diane Keaton) decide to assassinate Emperor Napoleon Bonaparte. A double of the Emperor is killed, and Allen's character is executed.
 In The Eagle Has Landed (1976), based on Jack Higgins's novel, German paratroopers attempt in 1943 to abduct Prime Minister Winston Churchill from an English village. It is revealed that it is actually a political decoy who visits the village and is assassinated.
 In Foul Play (1978), starring Goldie Hawn and Chevy Chase, the twin of an American archbishop kills the archbishop, impersonates him, and plots to assassinate a fictitious Pope Pius XIII.
 Akira Kurosawa's Kagemusha (1980): the warlord Takeda Shingen (1521–73) is sometimes impersonated by his brother Nobukado. Nobukado saves a thief who is to be executed, because the man bears an astonishing resemblance to Shingen. The thief becomes a kagemusha (shadow warrior) and learns the role of daimyō Shingen, who is subsequently killed by an enemy sniper. The false identity of the kagemusha is revealed when he is unable to ride Lord Shingen's favorite horse; but in the final battle at Nagashino the kagemusha accepts his role and fights as the last man holding the banner of the Takeda clan.
 The film Double Trouble (1984) features comedian duo Bud Spencer and Terence Hill playing two billionaires who, fearing for their lives after several assassination attempts, hire two look-alikes.
 In a feature-length episode of the British sitcom Only Fools and Horses entitled "Miami Twice", Derek is mistaken for a Mafia don who is his spitting image, and he is used by the Mafia in an attempt to fake the don's assassination (though several tries fail). The likeness is so uncanny that even Derek's brother Rodney is tricked. Both Derek and the don are played by David Jason.
 Moon over Parador (1988): Paul Mazursky's film in which a man who is filming in a fictional country in Latin America called Parador, is forced to play the role of the country's late president, whom he closely resembles.
 Dead Ringers, a 1988 psychological horror film, features Jeremy Irons in the dual role of two identical-twin gynecologists.
 Wait for Me in Heaven, a 1988 Spanish comedy, features Pepe Soriano as Francisco Franco and his decoy.
 In Roberto Benigni's Johnny Stecchino (1991), the main character is passed off for a snitch hiding from the mob.
 In Gary Ross' 1993 film Dave, an impersonator is hired by the U.S. President's chief of staff as a temporary decoy.
 In Ringo Lam's 1996 Maximum Risk, Jean-Claude Van Damme is a French policeman who discovers that a man who has been killed by the Russian Mafia was his look-alike twin brother that he never knew he had. Tracing the dead brother's footsteps, the protagonist inadvertently "inherits" the brother's predicaments and girlfriend.
 The 1999 film Star Wars: Episode I – The Phantom Menace features Queen Amidala of Naboo, whose planet is in crisis due to its illegal occupation by the Trade Federation. Near the conclusion of the film it is revealed that the "queen" (Keira Knightley) is in fact merely a handmaiden being used as a decoy, and Padmé (Natalie Portman) is the real queen, and has been posing as one of her own handmaidens. Knightley was cast in the role due to her close resemblance to Portman; even the two actresses' mothers had trouble distinguishing them in full make-up.
In the 1999 film Bowfinger the plot centers on a down-and-out filmmaker in Hollywood attempting to make a film on a small budget with a star who does not know that he is in the film, while also utilizing a lookalike of the star to shoot several scenes.
 In the Hindi movie,  Kaho Naa... Pyaar Hai, Roshan plays two different men
 The 2002 film Bubba Ho-Tep starred Bruce Campbell in the role of an elderly Elvis Presley who had traded places with an Elvis impersonator named Sebastian Haff (also played by Campbell) and now lives in a nursing home.
 Sherlock Holmes and the Case of the Silk Stocking, a 2004 BBC TV film directed by Simon Cellan Jones from an original story by Allan Cubitt, features the sleuth, played by Rupert Everett, tracking down a killer of aristocratic young women. Holmes' suspect seems to have airtight alibis—until the detective deduces that the culprit has a confederate: an identical twin.
 In The Prestige (2006), directed by Christopher Nolan, and adapted from the novel by Christopher Priest, two rival magicians employ doubles in their astonishing disappearing-reappearing acts.
 Goal III: Taking on the World (also known as Goal III) is set during the 2006 soccer World Cup and features convincing look-alikes including Derek Williams for Sven-Goran Eriksson, Frank Lampard and others who blend the transition from archive footage of the tournament with the fictional action depicted.
 Vantage Point (2008): a decoy helps protect the president from a possible assassination threat—and is shot. The film claims that "doubles have been used since Reagan."
 The Devil's Double (2011) dramatised Latif Yahia's claim to have been Uday Hussein's double.
 The Dictator (2012): A political satire black comedy film starring Sacha Baron Cohen both as a tyrannical yet childish despot and as a dimwitted political decoy.
 Masquerade (2012): South Korean historical film starring Lee Byung-hun in dual roles as the bizarre King Gwanghae and the humble acrobat Ha-sun, who stands in for the King when he faces the threat of being poisoned.
  The Scapegoat (2012) is a remake of the 1959 Alec Guinness film, starring Matthew Rhys.
 Enemy (2013): a college professor discovers look-alike actor 
 The Lookalike (2014) follows two criminals as they attempt to find a lookalike love interest for a drug lord after the unexpected death of the girl he's actually interested in.

Television 
 Several episodes of Adventures of Superman (1952–58) featured actors in dual roles as their doppelgangers, including "The Face and the Voice", in which George Reeves plays both the Man of Steel and a small-time criminal who is hired to impersonate him and wreak some havoc.
 The year after James Garner left the television series Maverick in 1959, in which he had portrayed a gambler named Bret Maverick, Warner Bros. studio hired Garner lookalike Robert Colbert to play Bret Maverick's brother Brent Maverick, who had never previously been mentioned, and dressed him in exactly the same costume.
 The Patty Duke Show (1963–66) starred Duke in a dual role as "identical cousins".
 In the ABC television series The Double Life of Henry Phyfe (1966), Red Buttons is the title character, a look-alike of a recently deceased foreign agent. A US intelligence agency recruits him to impersonate the agent on multiple occasions, on their behalf, despite his lack of intelligence-gathering skills.
 In the Inspector Morse two-part episode, "The Settling of the Sun" (1988), a Japanese summer student at Oxford University, Yukio Ley, and his double become victims of murders connected with revenge for Japanese World War II atrocities.
 The Lookalike (a made-for-TV thriller, 1990): A mentally disturbed woman is further tormented after discovering a girl who closely resembles her recently deceased daughter.
 The CBS television series of reality specials, I Get That a Lot (2009–13), poked fun at the concept of "celebrity lookalikes", featuring celebrities appearing in everyday situations, such as working as clerks at stores. When pegged as celebrities, they would simply state some variation of the titular phrase, "I get that a lot," pretending that they were ordinary individuals who had been mistaken for celebrities.
In The CW's series The Vampire Diaries (2009–17), doppelgängers were an important arc in the story. The female lead character, Elena Gilbert (Nina Dobrev), is a  doppelgänger of a thousand-year old immortal named Amara, a descendant named Tatia, and an antagonistic vampire named Katherine Pierce/Katerina Petrova. Their bloodline is called the Petrova Family. The male lead character, Stefan Salvatore (Paul Wesley), is also a doppelgänger of Amara's love, Silas, the first immortal. This led to the prophecy that Elena and Stefan, as doppelgängers of the first immortals, are soulmates and are fated to be with each other.
 The Woman in White: 2018 five-part BBC television adaptation of the sensation novel of the same name by Wilkie Collins. This TV production was preceded by 1966, 1982, and 1997 TV productions.

Musicals
 The Woman in White, a musical by Andrew Lloyd Webber and David Zippel, with book by Charlotte Jones, was first produced in 2004, based on the novel The Woman in White, by Wilkie Collins, and on elements of The Signal-Man by Charles Dickens.

Video games 
 In Final Fantasy VIII, SeeD mercenaries and Forest Owls resistance fighters devise a complicated plan to kidnap the president of Galbadia Vinzer Deling, which includes switching the presidential train wagon from its tracks and replacing it with a mockup. Deling foresees the plan and sends a shapeshifter monster to take his place, who attacks the game protagonists. The monster is ultimately killed, but the plan's failure forces the Forest Owls into hiding.
 In Metal Gear Solid, former drill instructor and adviser to the game's protagonist Solid Snake McDonnell Benedict Miller, better known by his nickname Master Miller is murdered before the game main events and replaced by main antagonist Liquid Snake in disguise. Liquid, as Master Miller, tricks Solid Snake into unknowingly do his bidding. The plot is discovered by Colonel Roy Campbell and his staff, who track Miller's communications and find out they are coming from Shadow Moses Island after the real Master Miller's corpse is found dead in his house.
 In Call of Duty: Black Ops the first mission consists in assassinating Fidel Castro. The player succeeds, but at the end, it is revealed that the Fidel Castro he killed was actually a body double.
 In Ace Attorney Investigations 2, it is revealed that the president of Zheng Fa (a fictional country) had its president killed 12 years prior. The president encountered by the protagonists in the first episode, as is not revealed until the 5th one, was ultimately a body double.

Web series 
 The Alternates, the main antagonistic force in the analog horror web series The Mandela Catalogue, are a race of demons that are marked by their ability to almost perfectly replicate human beings.

See also 
 Assassinations in fiction
 Cosplay
 False pretender
 List of actors who have played multiple roles in the same film
 Menaechmi, the classical play about separated twins
 Mimicry
 Operation Mincemeat
 Simulacrum
 Stand-in
 Twin

Notes